Steindachner's emo skink, Micronesian skink, dark-sided emoia, dark-sided skink, or dateline emoia (Emoia adspersa) is a species of lizard in the family Scincidae. It is found in Micronesia. The species has also been noted to occur on Niuafoʻou, the northernmost island of Tonga, with sightings in 1930 and 1994. The species is not present on other Tongan islands, and is possibly present due to waif dispersal occurring during Polynesian migration.

References

Emoia
Reptiles described in 1870
Taxa named by Franz Steindachner